The 1989 Newcastle earthquake was an intraplate earthquake that occurred in Newcastle, New South Wales on Thursday 28 December. The shock measured 5.6 on the Richter magnitude scale and was one of Australia's most serious natural disasters, killing 13 people and injuring more than 160.

Death toll and damage to buildings
The highest death toll and damage occurred at the Newcastle Workers Club, where the floor collapsed. Nine people were killed and many more were trapped beneath the rubble. Another three people were crushed to death when masonry from building façades collapsed onto awnings on Beaumont Street, Hamilton, an inner-city suburb of Newcastle. Following the death of a woman in Broadmeadow from earthquake-related shock, the final death toll was raised to 13.

The earthquake caused damage to over 35,000 homes, 147 schools, and 3,000 commercial and/or other buildings, with significant damage (i.e. damage worth over $1,000; $ in  adjusted for inflation) caused to 10,000 homes and 42 schools (structural damage), within the immediate Newcastle area.

The number of people in the city on the day of the earthquake was lower than usual, due to a strike by local bus drivers. The earthquake struck in the middle of an interview by a local television station NBN with a union representative.

Statistics

 Deaths: 13 total, including;
 9 people who were killed at the Newcastle Workers Club
 3 people who were killed in Beaumont Street, Hamilton
 1 person who died of earthquake-induced shock
The names of all 13 victims were published later in newspapers such as the Maitland Mercury
 Injuries: 160 people were hospitalised.
 Damaged buildings: 50,000 buildings were damaged; about 80 percent of these were homes.
 Demolition: 300 buildings were demolished including more than 100 homes, The Newcastle Workers Club, The Century Theatre, and King's Hall.
 Human effects: 300,000 people were affected and 1,000 made homeless.
 Cost: The total financial cost of the earthquake is estimated to have amounted to about $4  billion.
 Felt area: Estimated  around the epicentre.
 Magnitude: 5.6 ; 5.4 ; VIII MMI
 Epicentre: Boolaroo
 Aftershocks: One aftershock (M 2.1 on the Richter scale) was recorded on 29 December 1989.

Cause
In early 2007, a United States academic claimed that coal mining in the region triggered the earthquake, although earthquake activity has been present in the area at least since European settlement first occurred. That is in addition to the statement by the former head of the earthquake monitoring group at Geoscience Australia, Dr David Denham, that the Newcastle earthquake occurred some distance from mining activity:

"The depths of the focus of the earthquake was about 13, 14 kilometres, whereas the ones associated with mining, they're actually right close to the mine, because that's where the stress release takes place."

Despite records of previous earthquakes in the area, even the most recent construction codes in Newcastle at the time of the earthquake (issued in 1979) required neither the adoption of earthquake-resistant design nor the strengthening of old buildings, although they did encourage owners to provide more than the minimum strength.

In popular culture

Music
Songs about the Newcastle earthquake include 
 "10:27"/"Holocaust" by "The Lost Boys",(1990)  
 "Earthquakin'", recorded in January 1990 by Newcastle Ska Band The Porkers, 
 "Faultline" by Australian rock band Silverchair, from 1995. Silverchair lead singer Daniel Johns lost a childhood friend during the earthquake.
 "Our Town" by Wilson and Lightfoot 
 "The Newcastle Earthquake" by Gary Shearston (1990) CBS 655720

Literature
 "The Newcastle Earthquake Response Record - Volume 1" Prepared by Lt. Col. J.T Purser on behalf of Newcastle City Council (1990) 
 "The Earth was Raised Up in Waves Like the Sea: Earthquake Tremors Felt in the Hunter Valley Since White Settlement" by Cynthia Hunter (1991) 
 "What Came Between" by Patrick Cullen's  features a collection of stories, that begin with the earthquake. (2009) 
 "Quakeshake:A Child's Experience of the Newcastle Earthquake" by Dave O'Brien 
 "Aftershock" by Peter Corris (2014) 
 "Disasters in Australia and New Zealand" by Scott McKinnon and Margaret Cook -  
 "Six Seconds" by Alan Sunderland (2021)

Other
 Aftershocks, a 1991 play by Paul Brown, is based on interviews with members of the destroyed Newcastle Workers Club. A film of the same name was also released in 1998  
 Newcastle Museum also has a permanent exhibition
 The earthquake occurs in the Season 2, Episode 6 finale of the Australian and British TV series “Frayed”, set in Newcastle in 1989.

See also 

List of earthquakes in 1989
List of earthquakes in Australia

References

External links
Geoscience Australia: CCIP Project – Newcastle (Earthquake Risk in Newcastle and Lake Macquarie)

Newcastle
1989
Newcastle earthquake, 1989
History of Newcastle, New South Wales
1980s in New South Wales
Disasters in New South Wales
December 1989 events in Australia
1989 disasters in Australia